A bishop is a senior role in many Methodist denominations. The bishop's role is typically called the "episcopacy", based on the Greek word episkopos, which literally means overseer. Superintendent is another translation of episkopos but in Methodist churches this is a role distinct from bishop. The first Methodist bishops were appointed in America, and American Methodist denominations still recognize the office of bishop.

Origins of Methodist episcopacy

John Wesley consecrated Thomas Coke a "general superintendent" and directed that Francis Asbury also be consecrated for the United States in 1784, where the Methodist Episcopal Church first became a separate denomination apart from the Church of England. Coke soon returned to England, but Asbury was the primary builder of the new church. At first he did not call himself "bishop", but eventually submitted to the usage by the denomination.

Notable bishops in Methodist history include Coke, Asbury, Richard Whatcoat, Philip William Otterbein, Martin Boehm, Jacob Albright, John Seybert, Matthew Simpson, John S. Stamm, William Ragsdale Cannon, Marjorie Matthews (the first female Methodist bishop), Leontine T. Kelly, Vashti Murphy McKenzie, William B. Oden, William Willimon, R.S. Williams (the first Methodist (CME) bishop elected from Louisiana), Teresa Elaine Jefferson-Snorton, and Thomas Bickerton.

Duties

African Methodist Episcopal Church
In the African Methodist Episcopal Church bishops are the chief officers of the Connectional Organization. They are elected for life by a majority vote of the general conference which meets every four years.

Free Methodist Church
The Book of Discipline of the Free Methodist Church states that "Bishops are the overseers of the church. They lead the church to fulfill its mission which requires them to be holy examples with skill and experience to provide oversight. They must understand the nature and purpose of our church. They must also be able to communicate clearly the gospel, the church's mission and the vision of the Free Methodist Church; possess a well cultivated understanding of other cultures; and identify, develop, and lead godly, competent leaders."

Global Methodist Church
In the Global Methodist Church, bishops have a similar role to that in the United Methodist Church, although they are elected to limited terms, not appointed for life.

United Methodist Church
In the United Methodist Church, a resident bishop is appointed to a specific episcopal area (i.e., the bishop resident in the area; unless a bishop happens to be retired and simply residing in the area, not assigned to it).  A resident bishop is the Presiding Bishop of any and all annual (i.e., regional) conferences of the church within the area.  Such bishops are said to have residential as well as presidential duties within his/her area.

In the UMC, bishops serve as administrative and pastoral superintendents of the church. They are elected for life from among the ordained elders (presbyters) by vote of the delegates in regional (called jurisdictional) conferences, and are consecrated by the other bishops present at the conference through the laying on of hands. (Central conferences may choose to elect their bishop for a term shorter than life; in many cases the practice is election for a term of four years.) In The United Methodist Church bishops are not ordained in the traditional sense (i.e. belonging to the threefold ministry of bishop, presbyter, deacon) but remain members of the "Order of Elders" while being consecrated to the "Office of the Episcopacy."  Within The United Methodist Church only bishops are empowered to consecrate bishops and ordain clergy.  Among their most critical duties is the ordination and appointment of clergy to serve local churches as pastor, presiding at sessions of the annual, jurisdictional, and general conferences, providing pastoral ministry for the clergy under their charge, and safeguarding the doctrine and discipline of the church.  Furthermore, individual bishops, or the Council of Bishops as a whole, often serve a prophetic role, making statements on important social issues and setting forth a vision for the denomination, though they have no legislative authority of their own.  In all of these areas, bishops of United Methodist Church function very much in the historic meaning of the term. According to the Book of Discipline of the United Methodist Church, a bishop's responsibilities are

Annual conference
In each annual conference, United Methodist bishops serve for four year terms, and may serve up to three terms before either retirement or appointment to a new annual conference.

Council of Bishops

The collegial expression of episcopal leadership in the United Methodist Church is known is the Council of Bishops. The Council of Bishops speaks to the church and through the church into the world and gives leadership in the quest for Christian unity and interreligious relationships. The Conference of Methodist Bishops includes the United Methodist Council of Bishops plus bishops from affiliated autonomous Methodist or United churches.

References